Ioannis Bourousis, commonly known as Giannis Bourousis (alternate spelling: Yannis, Greek: Ιωάννης "Γιάννης" Μπουρούσης; born November 17, 1983) is a Greek former professional basketball player and basketball executive. He is the general manager of the Greek basketball club ASK Karditsa. During his playing career, at a height of 7 ft  in (2.15 m) tall and a weight of 270 lb. (122 kg), Bourousis played at the center position. Bourousis, who was a two-time All-EuroLeague First Team selection, was compared to FIBA Hall of Fame / Basketball Hall of Fame center Vlade Divac, by San Antonio Spurs' head coach Gregg Popovich.

Bourousis was on the senior Greek national team that won the gold medal at 2005 EuroBasket in Serbia, and he also played an instrumental role as Greece won the bronze medal at the 2009 EuroBasket. He was also a member of the Greek national teams that finished in fourth place at the 2007 EuroBasket, and in fifth place at the 2008 Summer Olympics. The indoor basketball arena Giannis Bourousis Karditsa New Indoor Arena, which is located in Karditsa, Greece, is named after him, in his honor.

Early years and youth career
Bourousis originally began his athletic career training to be a professional swimmer, but he grew too tall for the sport, and so he took up playing basketball, at the age of 18. He began playing basketball as a member of the youth clubs of the Greek club G.S. Karditsas.

Professional career
Bourousis began his professional career in the year 2001, with AEK Athens of the Greek Basket League. In 2006, he transferred to FC Barcelona of the Spanish ACB League. Later that same year, he joined the Greek EuroLeague club Olympiacos Piraeus.

In 2009, he was offered a 3-year $12 million contract by the NBA club the San Antonio Spurs. However, he turned down San Antonio's offer, and instead signed a 3-year contract extension with Olympiacos worth €5.1 million euros net income. The contract contained a €1 million buyout amount, which could only be used to sign with an NBA team. After 5 years with Olympiacos, the club decided to terminate his contract.

In the summer of 2011, just weeks before signing with Olimpia Milano, Bourousis was involved in a doping-related media controversy in Greece, after an unrelated football match-fixing probe of his (then future) father-in-law, Makis Psomiadis. However, Bourousis was quickly cleared of any suspected wrongdoing, after he submitted to drug testing for FIBA protocols, which are overseen by the World Anti-Doping Agency, in order to be cleared to play with the Greek national team at the 2011 EuroBasket.

On July 6, 2011, Bourousis agreed to a two-year contract with the Italian A League club Olimpia Milano. In July 2013, Bourousis signed a contract with the Spanish League club Real Madrid. With Real Madrid, Bourousis won the Spanish Supercup title in 2013, and the Spanish King's Cup title in 2014. In the summer of 2014, Real Madrid picked up their team option to keep him in the club for one more season.

In the 2014–15 season, Bourousis won the EuroLeague 2014–15 season championship, after his team, Real Madrid, defeated his former team, Olympiacos, by a score of 78–59 at the 2015 EuroLeague Final Four. Real Madrid also eventually finished the season winning the 2014–15 Spanish League championship, after a 3–0 series score in the ACB Finals against Barcelona. With that trophy, Bourousis' club won the Triple Crown.

In September 2015, Bourousis signed a contract with the Spanish ACB team Saski Baskonia. On December 30, 2015, he was named Spanish League Player of the Month, after being MVP of the week three times in the first half of the 2015–16 ACB season. He repeated his win again as the Spanish League's Player of the Month in January 2016, after averaging 18.5 points and 7 rebounds per game, including 24 points scored in his team's win against Real Madrid. On May 23, 2016, he was named the Spanish League's MVP of the 2015–16 season, after averaging 12.9 points, 7.1 rebounds, 2.2 assists, and 0.9 steals per game.

On July 12, 2016, Bourousis signed a two-year contract with the Greek club Panathinaikos Athens. On July 4, 2017, Panathinaikos announced the termination of Bourousis' contract. On July 10, 2017, Bourousis signed with the Zhejiang Lions of the Chinese Basketball Association (CBA).

Bourousis spent the 2020–21 season with the Greek Basket League club Peristeri Athens. He averaged 6.6 points, 5.2 rebounds, and 1.9 assists per game. On September 28, 2021, Bourousis signed with ASK Karditsa of the Greek 2nd Division, where he played during the 2021–22 season. After that season, he retired from playing pro club basketball.

National team career

Greek junior national team
Bourousis was a member of the Greek Under-20 junior national team that won the gold medal at the 2002 FIBA Europe Under-20 Championship, in Lithuania.

Greek senior national team

Bourousis was on the senior Greek national team that won the gold medal at the 2005 EuroBasket in Serbia, and he also played an instrumental role as Greece won the bronze medal at the 2009 EuroBasket. He was also a member of the Greek national teams that finished in fourth place at the 2007 EuroBasket, and in fifth place at the 2008 Summer Olympics.

During an international friendly game between the national teams of Greece and Serbia, during the 2010 Acropolis Tournament, the Serbian player, Nenad Krstić, hit Bourousis on the head with a chair. "I thought he was a fan attacking me", Krstić declared the next day. Bourousis first pressed charges against Krstić and decided to sue, but he quickly changed his mind and dropped the charges and the lawsuit.

Bourousis was also a member of the Greek men's national teams that competed at the: 2010 FIBA World Championship, the 2011 EuroBasket, the 2012 FIBA World Olympic Qualifying Tournament, the 2013 EuroBasket, the 2014 FIBA World Cup, the 2015 EuroBasket, the 2016 Turin FIBA World Olympic Qualifying Tournament, the 2017 EuroBasket, and the 2019 FIBA World Cup qualifiers.

Executive career
After he retired from playing professional club basketball, Bourousis began working as a basketball executive. In 2021, he became the Chairman of the Board of Directors of the Greek basketball club ASK Karditsa.

Career statistics

EuroLeague

|-
| style="text-align:left;"| 2002–03
| style="text-align:left;" rowspan=4| AEK Athens
| 3 || 0 || 6.0 || .429 || .000 || 1.000 || 2.0 || .0 || .0 || .0 || 2.7 || .0
|-
| style="text-align:left;"| 2003–04
| 12 || 0 || 7.9 || .500 || .000 || .429 || 2.2 || .3 || .3 || .3 || 1.8 || 2.2
|-
| style="text-align:left;"| 2004–05
| 18 || 0 || 11.0 || .510 || .167 || .500 || 3.7 || .3 || .4 || .4 || 3.4 || 4.6
|-
| style="text-align:left;"| 2005–06
| 11 || 8 || 23.3 || .438 || .333 || .833 || 7.2 || .3 || .5 || .5 || 8.5 || 9.5
|-
| style="text-align:left;"| 2006–07
| style="text-align:left;" rowspan=5| Olympiacos
| 19 || 13 || 16.0 || .678 || .409 || .727 || 5.7 || .8 || 1.1 || .7 || 8.6 || 12.7
|-
| style="text-align:left;"| 2007–08
| 21 || 10 || 19.4 || .500 || .432 || .769 || 5.2 || .5 || .5 || 1.2 || 5.8 || 9.0
|-
| style="text-align:left;"| 2008–09
| 22 || 7 || 21.3 || .591 || .259 || .625 || 7.4 || .7 || .7 || .5 || 12.5 || 16.1
|-
| style="text-align:left;"| 2009–10
| 17 || 2 || 16.4 || .531 || .471 || .765 || 4.8 || .7 || .9 || .6 || 8.8 || 10.9
|-
| style="text-align:left;"| 2010–11
| 18 || 11 || 17.5 || .530 || .367 || .678 || 6.6 || .7 || .6 || 1.3 || 10.7 || 14.2
|-
| style="text-align:left;"| 2011–12
| style="text-align:left;" rowspan=2| Milano
| 15 || 14 || 22.4 || .466 || .176 || .688 || 6.4 || .5 || .7 || .7 || 9.0 || 10.6
|-
| style="text-align:left;"| 2012–13
| 9 || 8 || 24.1 || .573 || .385 || .745 || 8.3 || 1.1 || .7 || .7 || 14.0 || 18.9
|-
| style="text-align:left;"| 2013–14
| style="text-align:left;" rowspan=2| Real Madrid
| 29 || 29 || 21.0 || .524 || .353 || .817 || 5.9 || .9 || .4 || .8 || 8.3 || 12.1
|-
| style="text-align:left;background:#AFE6BA;"| 2014–15†
| 28 || 10 || 11.8 || .505 || .200 || .727 || 3.3 || .9 || .5 || .4 || 5.0 || 6.8
|-
| style="text-align:left;"| 2015–16
| style="text-align:left;"| Baskonia
| 29 || 0 || 25.1 || .502 || .383 || .811 || 8.7 || 2.2 || .8 || .8 || 14.5 || 21.1
|-
| style="text-align:left;"| 2016–17
| style="text-align:left;"| Panathinaikos
| 33 || 7 || 18.2 || .399 || .291 || .788 || 4.8 || 1.0 || .5 || .5 || 7.8 || 10.1
|- class="sortbottom"
| style="text-align:left;"| Career
| style="text-align:left;"|
| 284 || 119 || 18.2 || .513 || .345 || .744 || 5.6 || .9 || .6 || .7 || 8.5 || 11.5

Domestic leagues

Awards and accomplishments

Greece men's national team

Under-20
 2002 FIBA Europe Under-20 Championship:

Senior
 2005 EuroBasket: 
 2008 FIBA World OQT: 
 2009 EuroBasket:

Club career
AEK Athens
Greek League Champion: (2002)

Olympiacos
 2× Greek Cup Winner: (2010, 2011)

Real Madrid
 EuroLeague Champion (2015)
 Spanish League Champion: (2015)
 2× Spanish Cup Winner: (2014, 2015)
 2× Spanish Supercup Winner: (2013, 2014)
 Triple Crown: Champion (2015)

Panathinaikos
 Greek League Champion: (2017)
 Greek Cup Winner: (2017)

ASK Karditsas
 Greek 2nd Division Champion: (2022)

Individual
 2× All-EuroLeague First Team: (2009, 2016)
 EuroLeague MVP of the Month: (March 2016)
 8× EuroLeague MVP of the Round
 EuroLeague rebounding leader (2016)
 Eurobasket.com's  All-Euroleague Defensive Team: (2011)
 Spanish League MVP: (2016)
 All-Spanish League Team: (2016)
 2× Spanish League Player of the Month: (December 2015, January 2016)
 6× Greek League All-Star: (2006, 2007, 2008, 2009, 2010, 2011)
 Greek All-Star Game MVP: (2009)
 3× Greek League Best Five: (2008, 2009, 2011)
 Greek League rebounding leader: (2007)
 4× Eurobasket.com's  All-Greek League Defensive Team: (2007, 2008, 2010, 2011)

References

External links

Giannis Bourousis at acb.com 
Giannis Bourousis at archive.fiba.com
Giannis Bourousis at basket.gr 
Giannis Bourousis at esake.gr 
Giannis Bourousis at eurobasket.com
Giannis Bourousis at euroleague.net
Giannis Bourousis at fibaeurope.com
Giannis Bourousis at legabasket.it 
Giannis Bourousis at proballers.com

1983 births
Living people
2010 FIBA World Championship players
2014 FIBA Basketball World Cup players
2019 FIBA Basketball World Cup players
AEK B.C. players
Basketball players at the 2008 Summer Olympics
CB Gran Canaria players
Centers (basketball)
FC Barcelona Bàsquet players
FIBA EuroBasket-winning players
Greek basketball executives and administrators
Greek Basket League players
Greek expatriate basketball people in China
Greek expatriate basketball people in Italy
Greek expatriate basketball people in Spain
Greek men's basketball players
Lega Basket Serie A players
Liga ACB players
Olympiacos B.C. players
Olimpia Milano players
Olympic basketball players of Greece
Panathinaikos B.C. players
Sportspeople from Karditsa
Real Madrid Baloncesto players
Saski Baskonia players
Zhejiang Lions players